The 1998 Motorola 300 was the sixth round of the 1998 CART FedEx Champ Car World Series season, held on May 23, 1998, on the Gateway International Raceway in Madison, Illinois. Alex Zanardi came through from 11th on the starting grid to win the race, after a quick pitstop from the Ganassi crew got him out ahead of long-time leader Michael Andretti at the final cycle of stops.

Classification

Race

Caution flags

Lap Leaders

Point standings after race

References 

Motorola 300
Motorola 300
Motorsport in Illinois